Thomas Larkin Malloy (September 24, 1954 – September 29, 2016) was an American soap opera actor, announcer, voice-over artist and acting teacher.

Early life 
Malloy was born in New York City, the third child of John and Theresa (née Larkin) Malloy, both Irish immigrants. He had one older brother, Patrick Malloy, and one older sister, Maureen Malloy.

Career 
He began his acting career in 1974 while he attended Iona College and acted in Off-Off-Broadway plays.

Larkin appeared (and later starred) in such soap operas as The Edge of Night, Guiding Light, and All My Children . He worked as the announcer for As the World Turns. While playing Schuyler Whitney on The Edge of Night, Malloy was hit by a car on Park Avenue. He was temporarily replaced by James Horan.

Personal life 
Malloy died on September 29, 2016 in New York City from complications of a heart attack he suffered on his 62nd birthday.

Filmography

Film

Television

References

External links
 Travis Montgomery profile from SoapCentral
 Kyle Sampson profile from SoapCentral

1954 births
2016 deaths
American male soap opera actors
American male stage actors
American male television actors
American male voice actors
American people of Irish descent
Male actors from New York City
Place of death missing